Falling Uphill is the first album by the Canadian girl pop rock band Lillix. It released by Maverick Records on May 27, 2003.

The album includes a cover version of The Romantics' song "What I Like About You". This song also notably appeared on the Freaky Friday soundtrack, as well as in The WB comedy series What I Like About You. The single releases are "It's About Time", "What I Like About You", and "Tomorrow". "It's About Time" peaked at #17 on the Japan Top 20 chart, number 5 on TRL, and number 33 on the Billboard US Mainstream Top 40 Airplay. In 2007, Nielsen certified the song as receiving 50,000 spins. "What I Like About You" failed to chart. "Tomorrow" reached number 48 on R&R magazine's Pop Airplay chart. The song "Fork in the Road" was also included on volume 2 of Barbie's Cali Girl CD.

Track listing

Notes
  signifies an additional producer

Personnel
Lillix
 Lacey-Lee Evin – vocals, keyboards
 Tasha-Ray Evin – vocals, guitar
 Louise Burns – vocals, bass
 Kim Urhahn – drums, backing vocals

Additional personnel
 Glen Ballard – guitar, keyboards, production
 John Fields – guitar, bass, production
 Linda Perry – guitar, bass, keyboards, production
 Corky James – guitar
 Chris Lyon – guitar
 Michael Thompson – guitar
 Phil Solem – guitar
 Patrick Warren – keyboards
 Eric Alexander – drums
 Matt Chamberlain – drums
 Ronnie Ciago – drums
 Dorian Crozier – drums
 Victor Indrizzo – drums
 Joey Marchiano – drums
 Dave Raven – drums
 Dawn Richardson – drums
 Michael Urbano – drums
 Rai Thistlethwayte – piano
 Josh Auer – bass
 Jimmy Johnson – bass
 Philip Steir – drum programming, production
 Brian Barnes - editing
 Jamie Harding – editing
 Steve Marcussen – mastering

Chart performance

References 

Lillix albums
2003 debut albums
Maverick Records albums
Albums produced by John Shanks
Albums produced by Philip Steir
Albums produced by Glen Ballard
Albums produced by Linda Perry